Maya Horgan Famodu is a Nigerian-American entrepreneur, founder and partner at Ingressive, a firm that provides market entry, technology research and market operations services for firms and businesses expanding into Africa. She also founded Ingressive Capital, a venture capital fund investing in Africa-based technology companies. She co-founded the High Growth Africa Summit, a conference on launching a successful business in Affrica, and founded Tech Meets Entertainment Summit, a deal-focused event for African celebrities and tech companies to build revenue-generating partnerships. Maya (with her colleagues, Sean Burrowes and Blessing Abeng) later co-founded Ingressive for Good, a nonprofit providing scholarships, technical training and talent placement for African youth.

Early life and education
Maya Horgan Famodu is from a Nigerian father and a White American mother. She spent most of her youth in Minnesota, United States. She attended Pomona College and graduated with a Bachelor of Arts degree in environmental sciences and completed a Prelaw Program at Cornell University.

Career
After her graduation from school, Horgan Famodu worked at JPMorgan Chase, before starting Ingressive in 2014 and Ingressive Capital in 2017. She started Ingressive Capital as a result of challenges faced by her friends in getting financial support for their businesses. Ingressive Campus Ambassador (ICA) program is another initiative of Ingressive in tertiary institutions within Nigeria, Kenya, Ghana, South Africa, Rwanda and Congo that provides funding, resources and mentorship to computer science students. The program has hubs in the University of Port Harcourt, University of Uyo, Kwara State Polytechnic, Ladoke Akintola University of Technology, Babcock University, Rivers State University, Cross River University of Technology, Federal University of Petroleum Resources Effurun, University of Benin and was launched in Ghana in 2018. In 2016, she co-founded High Growth Africa Summit, a conference on launching a successful business in Affrica.

Awards and recognition
Maya Horgan Famodu appeared on the Forbes Africa 30 Under 30 in 2018 in the technology category.

Maya also was awarded Forbes 30 Under 30 2021 for the United States Venture Capital category.

Personal life
Maya loves to ride her motorcycle, travel, dancing and choreography. She was a blogger with the Huffington Post from 2012 to 2015.

References

Living people
1991 births
Nigerian business executives
Nigerian women in business
Nigerian businesspeople
Nigerian women company founders
21st-century Nigerian businesspeople
21st-century Nigerian women
Pomona College alumni
Cornell University alumni